The Great Barbados hurricane was an intense Category 4 hurricane that left cataclysmic damage across the Caribbean and Louisiana in 1831.

Meteorological history
A possible Cape Verde hurricane, the storm slammed into Barbados, leveling the capital of Bridgetown on August 10. Some 1,500 people perished, either drowned by the  storm surge that the hurricane brought or crushed beneath collapsed buildings (including the St. John's Parish Church, Barbados). It produced great damage in Saint Vincent and Saint Lucia, and slightly touched Martinique.

On August 12, it arrived in Puerto Rico. Moving past Haiti and Cuba, it nearly destroyed the town of Les Cayes and damaged Santiago de Cuba, and then crossed the entire length of Cuba, passing Havana on August 14 (Hurricane Georges of 1998 had a similar track). Its estimated Category 4 winds brought ships ashore at Guantanamo Bay, causing mudslides, and resulted in major structural damage.

It turned to the northwest, where it made landfall near Last Island, Louisiana as a Category 3 hurricane on August 17. There it flooded parts of New Orleans from its  storm surge in Lake Pontchartrain and also causing hail. The back part of the city of New Orleans was completely inundated. It was simultaneously felt at Pensacola, Florida and Mobile, Alabama, and extended to Natchez, Mississippi  up the Mississippi river.

Impact
The Great Barbados Hurricane left 2,500 people dead and $7,000,000 in damage. Ludlum (1963) wrote: “It was one of the great hurricanes of the century, or any century.”

See also

North Atlantic tropical cyclone
List of tropical cyclones

Further reading

References

Barbados hurricane
1831 Barbados-Louisiana
Category 4 Atlantic hurricanes
Hurricanes in Barbados
Hurricanes in Louisiana
Barbados hurricane
August 1831 events
1831 natural disasters in the United States
1831 in the Caribbean
1831 meteorology